Sault Ste. Marie is a provincial electoral district in the Legislative Assembly of Ontario, representing the City of Sault Ste. Marie.

History

The riding was created in 1902 from part of Algoma East, and originally consisted of a large section of Algoma District from the boundary of Thunder Bay District to the mouth of the Echo River. It has essentially had the same boundaries (that of the city of Sault Ste. Marie) since the 1966 redistribution.

Prior to 1996, Ontario was divided into the same electoral districts as those used for federal electoral purposes. They were redistributed whenever a readjustment took place at the federal level.

In 2005, legislation was passed by the Legislature to divide Ontario into 107 electoral districts, beginning with the next provincial election in 2007. The eleven northern electoral districts, including Sault Ste. Marie, are those defined for federal purposes in 1996, based on the 1991 census (except for a minor boundary adjustment). The 96 southern electoral districts are those defined for federal electoral purposes in 2003, based on the 2001 census. Without this legislation, the number of electoral districts in northern Ontario would have been reduced from eleven to ten.

As a result, the provincial electoral district consists solely of the City of Sault Ste. Marie, while the federal electoral district also includes Prince Township, the Rankin, Garden River, Goulais Bay and Obadjiwan reserves, and a portion of Unorganized North Algoma District extending north to the Montreal River.

Demographics
According to the Canada 2011 Census
 Ethnic Groups: 89.2% White, 9.2% Aboriginal
 Languages: 87.0% English, 4.9% Italian, 4.1% French 
 Religion: 74.4% Christian (40.6% Catholic, 9.7% United Church, 6.4% Anglican, 2.7% Lutheran, 1.8% Presbyterian, 1.7% Pentecostal, 1.6% Baptist, 9.8% Other Christian), 24.6% No religion. 
 Average household income: $69,456
 Median household income: $56,051
 Average individual income: $37,466
 Median individual income: $30,118

Members of Provincial Parliament

This riding has elected the following members of the Legislative Assembly of Ontario:

Election results

		

	

		

	

		

	

		

	

		

		

	

	

^ Change from general election

2007 electoral reform referendum

References

Sources
 Elections Ontario
1999 results
2003 results
2007 results
 Centennial Edition of a History of the Electoral Districts, Legislatures and Ministries of the Province of Ontario 1867-1967
Map of riding for 2018 election

Ontario provincial electoral districts
Politics of Sault Ste. Marie, Ontario